The  is an Italian university oriented towards study by foreign students of Italian language and culture. In the academic year 2017–2018 it had a total of 944 undergraduate and 61 postgraduate students; of the undergraduates, approximately two thirds were women, and little more than one third were from outside Italy.

History 

The university was established by royal decree in 1925. 

In 2021 university officials were charged with helping footballer Luis Suárez to cheat on an Italian-language test.

Alumni 

 Helmut Berger
 Shirlee Emmons
 Michaëlle Jean
 Leka, Crown Prince of Albania
 Peter Maurer
 Bront Palarae
 Arthur Penn
 Iain Duncan Smith (though he did not obtain any qualifications or finish his exams)

References 

Educational institutions established in 1921
University for Foreigners Perugia
Universities in Italy
Education in Umbria
1921 establishments in Italy